Krauth is a surname. Notable people with the surname include:

Charles Krauth (disambiguation), multiple people
Karlheinz Krauth (1936–2020), German political scientist and magazine editor
Nigel Krauth (born 1949), Australian novelist
Raimund Krauth (1952–2012), German footballer
Thomas Krauth (born 1953), German art dealer and music producer
Vanesa Krauth (born 1981), Argentine tennis player
Marian Marsh (born Violet Krauth; 1913–2006)
Harriet Reynolds Krauth Spaeth (1845–1925), American organist, hymnwriter, translator